Abū Ḥanīfa Aḥmad ibn Dāwūd Dīnawarī (died 895) was a Persian Islamic Golden Age polymath, astronomer, agriculturist, botanist, metallurgist, geographer, mathematician, and historian.

Life 
Dinawari was born in the (now ruined) town of Dinawar in modern-day western Iran. It had some importance due to its geographical location, serving as the entrance to the region of Jibal as well as a crossroad between the culture of Iran and that of the inhabitants on the other side of the Zagros Mountains. The birth date of Dinawari is uncertain; it is likely that he was born during the first or second decade of the 9th-century. He was instructed in the two main traditions of the Abbasid-era grammarians of al-Baṣrah and of al-Kūfah. His principal teachers were Ibn al-Sikkīt and his own father.  He studied grammar, philology, geometry, arithmetic, and astronomy and was known to be a reliable traditionalist. His most renowned contribution is the Book of Plants, for which he is considered the founder of Arabic botany.

Dinawari's Kitāb al-akhbār al-ṭiwāl (General History), written from a Persian point of view, is possibly the earliest apparent effort to combine Iranian and Islamic history. While historians such as al-Tabari and Bal'ami devoted the introduction of their work to long discourses on the duration of the world, Dinawari attempted to establish the importance of Iranshahr ("land of Iran") as the centre of the world. In his work, Dinawari notably devoted much less space to the Islamic prophet Muhammad compared to that of Iran. Regardless, Dinawari was a devoted Muslim, as indicated by his commentary on the Qur'an. He concluded the history with the suppression of Babak Khorramdin's rebellion in 837, and the subsequent execution of the Iranian general Khaydhar ibn Kawus al-Afshin.

Besides having access to early Arabic sources, Dinawari also made use of Persian sources, including pre-Islamic epic romances. Fully acquainted with the Persian language, Dinawari occasionally inserted phrases from the language into his work.

Dinawari's spiritual successor was Hamza al-Isfahani (died after 961).

Works
The tenth century biographical encyclopaedia, al-Fihrist written by Al-Nadim, lists sixteen book titles by Dinawari:

Mathematics and natural sciences
Kitâb al-kusuf ("Book of Solar Eclipses")
Kitāb an-nabāt yufadiluh al-‘ulamā' fī ta’līfih, ‘Plants, valued by scholars for its composition'
Kitāb Al-Anwā 'Tempest' (weather)
Kitāb Al-qiblah wa'z-zawāl "Book of Astral Orientations"
Kitāb ḥisāb ad-dūr, "Arithmetic/Calculation of Cycles"
Kitāb ar-rud ‘alā raṣd al-Iṣbhānī Refutation of Lughdah al-Iṣbhānī
Kitāb al-baḥth fī ḥusā al-Hind, "Analysis of Indian Arithmetic"
Kitāb al-jam’ wa'l-tafrīq; "Book of Arithmetic/Summation and Differentiation"
Kitāb al-jabr wa-l-muqabila, "Algebra and Equation"
Kitāb nuwādr al-jabr, "Rare Forms of Algebra"

Social sciences and humanities
Ansâb al-Akrâd ("Ancestry of the Kurds").
 Kitāb Kabīr  "Great Book" [in history of sciences]
Kitāb al-faṣāha, "Book of Rhetoric"
Kitāb al-buldān, "Book of Cities (Regions) (Geography)"
Kitāb ash-sh’ir wa-shu’arā’, "Poetry and the Poets"
Kitāb al-Waṣāyā, Commandments (wills);
Kitāb ma yulahan fīh al’āmma, How the Populace Errs in Speaking;
Islâh al-mantiq ("Improvement of Speech")
Kitāb al-akhbār al-ṭiwāl, "General History"

Editions & Translations
His General History (Al-Akhbar al-Tiwal) has been edited and published numerous times (Vladimir Guirgass, 1888; Muhammad Sa'id Rafi'i, 1911; Ignace Krachkovsky, 1912; 'Abd al-Munim 'Amir & Jamal al-din Shayyal, 1960; Isam Muhammad al-Hajj 'Ali, 2001), but has not been translated in its entirety into an European language. Jackson Bonner has recently prepared an English translation of the pre-Islamic passages of al-Akhbar al-Tiwal.

Book of Plants
Al-Dinawari is considered the founder of Arabic botany for his Kitab al-Nabat (Book of Plants), which consisted of six volumes. Only the third and fifth volumes have survived, though the sixth volume has partly been reconstructed based on citations from later works. In the surviving portions of his works, 637 plants are described from the letters sin to ya. He describes the phases of plant growth and the production of flowers and fruit.

The first part of the Book of Plants describes astronomical and meteorological concepts as they relate to plants, including the planets and constellations, the sun and moon, the lunar phases indicating seasons and rain, anwa, and atmospheric phenomena such as winds, thunder, lightning, snow, and floods. The book also describes different types of ground, indicating which types are more convenient for plants and the qualities and properties of good ground.

Al-Dinawari quoted from other early Muslim botanical works that are now lost, such as those of al-Shaybani, Ibn al-Arabi, al-Bahili, and Ibn as-Sikkit.

See also
 List of Persian scientists and scholars
 Muslim Agricultural Revolution

Notes

References

Bibliography

External links
 Dinawari at Encyclopædia Britannica
 The Book of plants of Abu Hanifa ad-Dinawari
 Translation of the Pre-Islamic Portion of al-Akhbar al-Tiwal by Jackson Bonner

9th-century births
895 deaths
9th-century Iranian philosophers
9th-century Iranian astronomers
9th-century geographers
9th-century Iranian historians
9th-century Iranian mathematicians
9th-century philologists
9th-century Arabic writers
9th-century biologists
9th-century botanists
9th-century linguists
9th-century zoologists
Poets from the Abbasid Caliphate
Mathematicians from the Abbasid Caliphate
Astronomers from the Abbasid Caliphate
Astronomers of the medieval Islamic world
Iranian Arabists
Botanists of the medieval Islamic world
Grammarians of Kufa
Linguists from Iran
Medieval grammarians of Arabic
Medieval Iranian geographers
People from Kermanshah Province
Iranian historians of Islam
Iranian grammarians